*Dʰéǵʰōm (Proto-Indo-European: *dʰéǵʰōm or *dʰǵʰōm; lit. 'earth'), or *Pleth₂wih₁ (PIE: *pleth₂wih₁, lit. the 'Broad One'), is the reconstructed name of the Earth-goddess in the Proto-Indo-European mythology.

The Mother Earth (*Dʰéǵʰōm Méh₂tēr) is generally portrayed as the vast (*pleth₂wih₁) and dark (*dʰengwo-) abode of mortals, the one who bears all things and creatures. She is often paired with Dyēus, the daylight sky and seat of the never-dying and heavenly gods, in a relationship of contrast and union, since the fructifying rains of Dyēus might bring nourishment and prosperity to local communities through formulaic invocations. Dʰéǵʰōm is thus commonly associated in Indo-European traditions with fertility, growth, and death, and is conceived as the origin and final dwelling of human beings.

Name and etymology 
The Proto-Indo-European (PIE) word for 'earth', *dʰ(é)ǵʰōm (acc. dʰǵʰ-ém-m, gen. *dʰǵʰ-mós), is among the most widely attested words in Indo-European languages (cf. Albanian dhe and toka; Hittite tēkan, tagān; Sanskrit kṣám; Greek khthṓn; Latin humus; Avestan zam; Tocharian tkaṃ; Old Irish dú, Lithuanian žẽmė; Old Slavonic zemlja), which makes it one of the most securely reconstructed PIE terms. On the other hand, the linguistic evidence for the ritualization of the name *dʰéǵʰōm is not systematically spread across the inherited traditions, as she also appears under other names and epithets, principally *Pleth₂-wih₁ (the 'Broad One').

If the PIE Earth-goddess is reliably reconstructed under the name *Dʰéǵʰōm, with *Pleth₂-wih₁ being one of her epithets, she was most likely the Earth herself conceived as a divine entity, rather than a goddess of the earth, Proto-Indo-European mythology still relying on a strong animistic substrate.

Epithets 
Based on comparative analysis of textual and epigraphic evidence, historical linguists and philologists have been able to reconstruct with a comfortable level of certainty several epithets and expressions that were associated with *Dʰéǵʰōm in Proto-Indo-European times: *Pléth₂wih₁ (the 'Broad One'), *Dʰéǵʰōm Méh₂tēr ('Mother-Earth'), and, in this form or a similar one, *Dʰéǵʰōm Dʰengwo- ('Dark Earth').

The Broad One 
The commonest epithet applied to the earth in Indo-European poetic traditions is *Pléth₂wih₁ (the 'Broad One'), which is the feminine form of *pléth₂-us, meaning 'flat, vast, broad'. A group of cognates appear in various divine names, including the Vedic earth-goddess Pṛthvī, the Greek nymph Plataia, and the Gaulish goddess Litavī. The epithet is also attested in nearly identical poetic expressions associating *dʰéǵʰōm and *pléth₂wih₁: Avestan ząm pərəθβīm ('broad earth'), Sanskrit kṣā́m ... pṛthivī́m ('broad earth'), and Old Hittite palḫiš ... dagan(-zipaš) ('broad ... earth[-genius]').

Another similar epithet is the 'All-Bearing One', the one who bears all things and creatures. She was also referred to as 'much-nourishing' or 'rich-pastured' in Vedic, Greek, and Old Norse ritual expressions sharing the root *plh₁u- ('much').

In the Proto-Indo-European cosmology, the earth Dʰéǵʰōm was likely perceived as a vast, flat and circular continent surrounded by waters ('The Ocean').

Mother Earth 
The Earth-goddess was widely celebrated with the title of 'mother' (méh₂tēr), and often paired with *Dyḗus ph2tḗr, the 'sky-father'. She is called annas Dagan-zipas ('Mother Earth-genius') in Hittite liturgy, and paired with the Storm-god of heaven, as well as Mat' Syra Zemlya ('Mother Moist Earth') in the Russian epic poems. To the Vedic goddess of the earth Prithvi is often attached the epithet Mata ('mother') in the Rigveda, especially when she is mentioned together with Dyaus, the sky-father.
The Baltic earth-goddess Zemyna is likewise associated with the epithets 'Mother of the Fields' and 'Mother of the Forests'. She is also treated respectfully as mother of humans. Similarly, the cult of the "Earth Mother" in old Slavic religion and traditions associated the earth with the progenetrix's role. In a legend from Smolensk, it is told that a human has three mothers: a birth mother (rodna) and two great (velikih) mothers, Mother Moist Earth and the Mother of God. Additionally, the Anglo-Saxon goddess Erce (possibly meaning 'bright, pure') is called the 'mother of Earth' (eorþan modor) and likely identified with Mother Earth herself in a ritual to be performed on an unfruitful plough-land. She is also called Fīra Mōdor ('Mother of men') in Old English poetry.

A similar epithet, Mother of All (Μητηρ Παντων), is ascribed to the Greek earth-goddess Gaia, as recorded for instance in Aeschylus' Prometheus Unbound (παμμῆτόρ τε γῆ; "Oh! universal mother Earth"), and in The Libation Bearers (ἰὼ γαῖα μαῖα; Mother Gaia). Likewise, some Orphic hymns attach the epithet 'mother' to Earth (γαῖα θεὰ μήτηρ). In a Samaveda hymn dedicated to the Vedic fire god Agni, he is described as "rapidly ... [moving] along his mother earth". In an Atharveda Hymn (12.1) (Pṛthvī Sūkta, or Bhūmī Sūkta), the celebrant invokes Prithvi as his Mother, because he is "a son of Earth". The word bhūmi is also used as an epithet of Prithvi meaning 'soil' and in reference to a threefold division of the universe into heavens, sky, and earth. On her own, Bhūmi is another Vedic deity with Mother-Earth attributes.

The Greek goddess of the harvest and agriculture Demeter could also be a cognate, possibly deriving from an Illyrian root dā- (from ) attached to māter ('mother'), although this proposition remains controversial in scholarship. The Roman evidence for the idea of Earth as a mother is doubtful, as it is usually associated with the name Terra rather than Tellus (the pre-Imperial earth-goddess), and the attested tradition may have been influenced by Greek motifs.

Dark Earth 
Another Proto-Indo-European epithet, *dʰéǵʰōm dʰengwo- or *dʰéǵʰōm dʰṇgu- ('dark earth'), can be reconstructed from the Hittite formulae dankuiš dagan-zipaš ('dark genius of the earth') and dankuš tēkan, which were frequently used to name the underworld, but sometimes also the earth's surface, and partially from the Albanian and Slavonic expressions dhe të zi ('black earth') and *črnā(yā) zemyā ('dark earth'), which have retained the term *dʰéǵʰōm. Other reflexes can be found in Greek Gaia Melaina (γαîα μέλαινα; 'black earth'), or in Old Irish domun donn ('brown earth'). A Lithuanian expression takes the form "may the black earth not support me".

In Latvian dainas about plant fertility, the color black symbolized a good and abundant harvest, and the black soil was considered the most fertile. In a Russian fairy tale, the maiden is buried "under a blanket of black earth". Another expression with similar meaning, "черна земя" ('black earth'), is also attested in Bulgarian folk verses. The formula of the dark earth seems to be related to invocation or oaths, where the announcer summons the Earth as an observer or witness, as seen by Solon's elegiac Fragment 36. The Slavic deity 'Moist Earth' (Syra Zemlya) was similarly invoked during oaths and called to witness in land disputes.

Role

Mating with the Sky Father 

The Earth goddess was conceived as the dark dwelling of mortals, in contrast with Dyēus, the bright diurnal sky and the seat of the gods. Both deities often appear as a pair, the Sky Father (*Dyḗws Ph₂tḗr) uniting with Mother Earth (*Dʰéǵʰōm Méh₂tēr) to bring fertility and growth. The Earth is thus often portrayed as the giver of good things: she is exhorted to become pregnant in an Old English prayer, and Slavic peasants described Zemlja as a prophetess that shall offer favourable harvest to the community. The unions of Zeus with Semele and Demeter is similarly associated with fertility and growth in Greek mythology. According to Jackson, however, Dʰéǵʰōm is "a more fitting partner of Perkwunos than of Dyēus", since the former is commonly associated with fructifying rains as a weather god.

The Earth–Heaven couple was probably not at the origin of the other heavenly gods. The Divine Twins and H2éwsōs seem to have been conceived by Dyēus alone, since they are mentioned through the formulaic expressions *Diwós Népoth1e ('Descendants of Dyēus') and *Diwós Dhuǵh2tḗr ('Daughter of Dyēus), respectively.

Anatolian 
In Hittite mythology, the Storm God of Heaven, one of the most important in the Hittite pantheon, has been syncretized with local Anatolian or Hattian deities, merging with a local storm god with terrestrial characteristics. At a later point, the Storm God of Heaven was paired with local goddess Wurulemu, with chthonic traits.

Indo-Aryan 

In the Vedic texts, Prithvi the mother is usually paired with Dyaus the father, as shown for instance in Samaveda hymns. Due to their complementary relationship, they are celebrated as universal parents. However, other texts of sacred literature attribute different partners to the Earth goddess: in an Atharveda Hymn (12.1), Prithvi is coupled with Parjanya (Sanskrit: पर्जन्य, parjánya), a deity of rain and fertilizer of earth. In the same hymn, verse 6 (12.1.6), Indra, another Vedic deity of thunder and rain, is described as "consort" and protector of Earth.

According to Herodotus, the Scythians considered Earth to be the wife of Zeus.

Graeco-Roman 
Zeus is associated with Semele, a possible descendant of Dʰéǵʰōm, but also with Demeter, which could be another cognate stemming from the Mother Earth. In the Danaids, Aeschylus describes how Ouranos and Chthôn are seized by a mutual desire for sexual intercourse: the rain falls, then Earth conceives and brings forth pasture, cereal crops, and foliage. Likewise, "Heaven and Earth" regularly appear as a duo among deities invoked as witnesses to Hittite treaties, and the Roman Tellus Mater is paired with Jupiter in Macrobius's Saturnalia.

The mating of Zeus and female characters with chthonic elements (Démeter) or associated with earth (such as Semele, Plataia and Themis) may be a remnant of the Sky/Earth coupling. Other religious expressions and formulas in Greek cultic practice attest to a wedding or union between a sky-god and an earth-mother: the Homeric Hymn to Gaia calls her "Wife of Starry Ouranos"; weddings in Athens were dedicated to both Ouranos and Gaia; an Orphic hymn tells that the cultist is both "a child of Earth and starry Sky"; in Athens, there was a statue of Gaia on the Acropolis depicting her beseeching Zeus for rain; Zeus Chthonios and Gê Chthonia form a cultic pair in Mykonos; Zeus is invoked with an Earth Mother partner by their priestesses in Dodona; a funerary epigram of one Lycophron of Pherai, son of Philiskos, states he shall live "among the stars uplifted by his father" (Zeus), while his body "occupies mother earth".

In the cosmogony of Pherecydes of Syros, male deity Zas (identified with Zeus and the celestial/heavenly heights) unites with female character Chthonie (associated with the earth and the subterranean depths) in sacred rites of marriage, a union that appears to hark back to "the theology of the rites of fertility-fecundity" and lays the foundation of the cosmos;

Ancient Roman scholar Varro, in his book De re rustica, listed five divine pairs, among which Juppiter, "father", and Tellus, "the Earth mother", both responsible for the fruitfulness of agriculture.

Norse 
In Norse mythology, the goddess Jörd, a jötunn (giantess) whose name means 'earth' (from Proto-Germanic *erþō-, 'earth, soil, land'), begets the thunder-god Thor (Donar) with Odinn–not a sky-god, although a chief god of the Norse pantheon. A line in the Gylfaginning by Norse poet Snorri Sturluson mentions that the Earth is both daughter and wife ("Jörðin var dóttir hans ok kona hans") of the All-Father, identified as Odinn.

Slavic 
Russian scholar O. G. Radchenko points that remnants of the coupling exist in East Slavic riddles, incantations and herb charms. As pointed by scholarship, Croatian historian Natko Nodilo saw an occurrence of the Masculine Heavens and Feminine Earth in the riddle Visok tata, plosna mama, bunovit zet, manita devojka ("Tall father, fat mother, rebellious son-in-law, frenzied maiden"), about the components of the world, and whose answer is "Sky, Earth, Wind and Fog". In a Russian incantation (Beschwörungsformel), heaven and earth are referred to as a father/mother pair: Ty nebo otec; ty zemlja mat'. ("You Heaven are father; you Earth are mother"). A folk expression "plaskófka matka, vysoki tatka" refers to "the low, flat earth" in contrast with "the highest sky".

Polish scholarship also indicates some holdover of the idea exists in the folklore of Poland, for instance, in folk riddle Matka nisko, ojciec wysoko, córka ślepa, syn szalony ("A mother low down,  a father high up, a blind daughter and a mad son"), whose answer is "earth, heaven, night, wind".

In a charm collected in Arkhangelsky and published in 1878 by historian Alexandra Efimenko (ru), the announcer invokes "Mother-Earth" (Земля мать) and "Father Heaven" (небо отец). According to researcher Natalya Polyakova, there was among the Slavs an old belief that earth was fertilized by the heavenly rains and that it was a sin to profane her. If this happened, the heavenly father would no longer send her rains, and thus would cause drought.

Baltic 
Baltic scholarship recognizes in ancient Baltic beliefs a division of the world into a heavenly half, with masculine and dynamic attributes and associated with light and celestial bodies, and an earthly half, feminine and static, related to plants and waters.

According to Nijole Laurinkiene, in Baltic tradition, it was said that the earth closed off (as in "sleeping" or "hibernating") near the end of autumn/beginning of winter, and "opened up" with the coming of the spring - a season when the first rains begin to fall. For this reason, it was believed that Baltic thunder god Perkūnas acted as the "opener" of the earth with his rains, making the grass grow and bringing life anew. In later tradition, it seems this deity was replaced by Saint George (Jurgis, Yurja, Sveti Juraj), who, in folksongs, was described as opening the earth in the spring with a key.

Final dwelling of mortals 

Dʰéǵʰōm had a connection with both death and life: the deceased are made from her and shall eventually return to her, but the crop also grows from her moist soil fertilized by the rain of Dyēus. This points to a hierarchical conception of the status of mankind regarding the heavenly gods, confirmed by the widespread use of the term 'mortal' as a synonym of 'human' rather than 'living species' in Indo-European traditions. In a Hittite military oath, the earth is said to drink the blood of the fallen ("This not wine, it is your blood, and as the earth has swallowed this..."), as in Aeschylus' Seven Against Thebes (736) and in the Indian Mahabharata ("... the earth shall drink today the blood of their king").

The word for 'earth' underlies the many formations for designating humans, because they are seen as 'earthly' or fashioned from the earth itself. It is attested in the derivative forms *dʰǵʰ(e)-mōn and *dʰǵʰom-yos, which underwent a semantic shift from 'earthling' to 'human': Sanskrit jmán ('from the earth') and kṣámyaḥ ('earthly'), Latin homō ('man'), Gothic guma ('man'), Old Lithuanian žmuõ ('man') and Old Prussian smoy ('man'), Old Irish duine ('man'), and Gaulish -xtonio ( 'man'?). The Neo-Phrygian term zemelōs (ζεµελως) is interpreted as meaning 'men', or 'terrestrial' as opposed to 'heavenly'. In the words of linguist Antoine Meillet, those metaphors go back to a time when it was "natural to designate 'humans' by the distinctive features that distinguish them from the gods: mortality, life on earth".

Greek
In a religious context, Chthôn (Χθών) was conceived as the nether land of the underworld deities and the dead (Iliad 6,411; 8,14; Theogony 119; etc.), and often as the world itself as opposed to the sky.

Another reflex of Dʰéǵʰōm as the mother of mortals and their final resting place may also be found in Demetrioi ('of Demeter'), an Athenian designation for the dead, and in Aeschylus's verses in Choephori 127: "Yea, summon Earth, who brings all things to life, / And rears and takes again into her womb." In addition, Demeter was worshipped in some Greek cities in relation to her connection to the Underworld (cf. epithet Chthonia, 'of the earth, underworld'), besides her typical association with grains and crops. Demeter was also associated with the role of ward or mother of the dead: according to Plutarch's On the Face in the Moon's Orb, Demeter, who rules over the earth and all earthly things, separates the soul from the body after a human dies.

A similar imagery is described by poet Euripides, in his play The Suppliants, lines 530-536: "Let the dead now be buried in the earth, / and each element return to the place from where it came to the body, / (...) the body to the ground; / for in no way did we get it / for our own, but to live our life in, and after that its mother earth must take it back again". A funerary epigram of one Lycophron of Pherai, son of Philiskos, states his body, given by mother, now "occupies mother earth" (μητέρα γἥν).

Baltic
Moreover, historical sources on Baltic mythology, specially on Lithuanian and Latvian religions and practices, describe the dual role of goddesses Zemyna and Zemes Mate: while they were connected to the fertility of the land, they were also associated with receiving the dead and acting as their ruler and guardian.

In Latvian dainas, Zemes Mate is associated with fellow Mahte ("Mothers") Velu Mate ('Mother of Dead Souls') and Kari Mate ('Mother of Graves'). According to researcher Elza Kokare, Zemes Mate and Kari Mate act as the resting places of the dead, guarding its body and holding the key to their graves. As an individual character, Zemes mate is invoked as a person's final resting place. Pieces of Lithuanian folklore also make references to Earth as mother of humans and their final abode after death.

Funeral lamentations, such as some collected in Veliouna in the 19th and 20th centuries, attest the expression "sierą žemelę" as the destination of the deceased to whom the lament is dedicated. In a later military death lament, the "sierą žemelę" is said to drink the blood of the fallen soldier, after being shot. An issue of Lithuanian newspaper Draugas published a dainas wherein the person invokes the earth as "žeme, žeme, siera žemele", and asks it to take her, a maiden, having already taken father and mother ("Atėmei tėvą ir motinėlę"), but the earth scolds her.

Slavic
Old Slavic beliefs seem to attest some awareness of this ambivalent nature of the Earth: it was considered men's cradle and nurturer during one's lifetime, and, when the time of death came, it would open up to receive their bones, as if it were a "return to the womb".

In Polish curses, the malediction is aimed towards "the Holy Earth" (święta ziemia) not receiving the remains of the person cursed (as in, Bodaj cię święta ziemia nie przyjęła! and Oby cię święta ziemia nie przyjęła!). Researcher Anna Engelking cited that scholar Boris Uspensky wrote "a comprehensive analysis of the mythical trope of holy earth: the mother of humankind, which gives birth to people and accepts their bodies after death". Similarly, the imagery appears in "funeral hymns and speeches", e.g., Powracasz w ziemię, co twą matką była,/ Teraz cię strawi, niedawno żywiła ("You return to earth that has been your mother,/ She has fed you so far, now you’ll be devoured").

The imagery of the terre humide ("moist earth") also appears in funeral lamentations either as a geographical feature (as in Lithuanian and Ukrainian lamentations) or invoked as Mère-Terre humide ("Mother Moist Earth"). The imagery and expression of "Mother Moist Earth" seem to have persisted well into the 21st century, although divorced from its sacral aspect.

In a Ukrainian lamentation, the mourner invokes earth as his "damp mother" ("Земле ж моя земле, мать сирая"), and asks it to take him, the mourner ("a young one"), since it has already taken father ("отця") and mother ("неньку", endearing or diminutive form of "не́ня").

In Belarusian folk songs, the earth is invoked as "syroj ziamli-matušcy" ('damp earth-mother'), and even referred to as the resting place of the mourner's loved one ("Žoŭcieńki piasok, syraja ziamlia, Tut pachavana milaja maja"; English: 'Yellow sand, damp earth: here my dear is buried'). In addition, phraseological studies by linguist Olga A. Lyashchynskaya (be) recognize the incidence of the expression in Belarusian: expression "спаць у сырой зямлі" ('to sleep in the damp earth') is a metaphor for death; expression "ляжаць у сырой зямлі/зямельцы" ("to lie in the damp earth/ground") denotes a burial ("to be interred"); "ажаніцца з <сырою> зямлёй" ("to marry the [moist] earth") means "to die".

Serbian idiomatic expressions also associate the earth with the grave, and the formula "dark earth" ("crna zemlja") appears in reference to the resting place of the dead.

Mat' Syra Zemlya is also invoked in wedding songs by the orphan bride for her parents to bless her journey to the new household.

Indo-Aryan
In Book 10 of the Rigveda, Hymn XVIII (a funeral hymn), verses 10-13, the earth is invoked to receive the body of the departed and to cover him gently, as a mother does a child: "10. Betake thee to the lap of Earth the Mother, of Earth far-spreading, very kind and gracious. (...) 11. Heave thyself, Earth, nor press thee downward heavily: afford him easy access, gently tending him. Cover him, as a mother wraps her skirt about her child, O Earth." A second hymn in Vedic sacred literature requests Earth to open up and explicitly receive the dead, while also mentioning the "two kings", Yama and Varuna: "Open thy arms, o Earth, receive the dead/ With gentle pressure and with loving welcome / Embrace him tenderly, e'en as a mother / Folds her soft vestment round the child she loves. / Soul of the dead, depart (...)".

In the Śatapatha Brāhmaṇa, written by Vedic sage Yajnavalkya, there is reference to a ritual of the placement of the bones of the deceased in the earth after cremation. According to the Kanda XIII,8,3,3, the text says that "May Savitri deposit thy bones in the mother's lap [māturupastha].' Savitri thus deposits his bones in the lap of the mother [māturupastha], this earth [pṛthivyai]; 'O Earth, be thou propitious unto him!'".

Evidence

*Dʰéǵʰōm 
Cognates stemming from *dʰéǵʰōm are attested in the following mythologies:

 PIE: *dʰ(é)ǵʰ-ōm (acc. dʰǵʰ-ém-m, gen. *dʰǵʰ-mós), the 'earth',
Anatolian: *déǵ-m,
Hittite: Tagān-zepa- ('Genius of the Earth; later dagān-zipa-), a chthonic deity also serving as a witness in treaties (composed of the stem dagan-, 'earth', attached to šipa, 'genius'),
Proto-Greek: *kʰtʰōn, 'earth' (the initial consonant cluster *dʰǵʰ- evolved into *kʰtʰ- via metathesis; the final -m turned into -n through regular sound laws),
Greek: Chthonie, attested in fragmentary passages of Pherecydes of Syros as a primordial goddess of earth who changed her name to Gaia after Zeus married her; she is depicted as Chthôn (Χθών), the partner of Ouranos in Aeschylus' Danaids; the same name is also used as an epithet of Poseidon by Homer; the epithets Chthonía (Χθωνία; 'belonging to the earth, the ground, the underworld'), associated with the grain goddess Demeter, and Chtónios (Χθόνιος; id.), attached to Zeus or Hermes as those who go to the underworld; another cognate appears in the name of the chthonic deities (χθόνιοι θεοί) of the underworld,
Old Avestan: Zām ('Earth'), a sanctified being in the Zoroastrian tradition that embodies the concept of Earth,
Young Avestan: Zamyād (a contraction of *zām huδād yazad), divinity of the Munificent Earth in the Zamyād Yašt.
Balto-Slavic: *źem- (from*dʰǵʰ-em-),
Baltic: *žeme,
Lithuanian: Žemyna (also  Žemynėlė and Žemelė), a goddess celebrated as the bringer of flowers, and a recipient of prayers and sacrifices; expression sierà žěmė ('wet/humid earth');
Latvian: Zemes Māte ('Mother Earth'), one of the goddesses of death in Latvian mythology,
Slavic: ,
East Slavic:
Old Russian: Mat' Syra Zemlya ('Mother Moist Earth'), in the byliny (epic poems), and Matushka zeml'ja ('Little Mother Earth') in folk incantations to ensure a good harvest;
Ukrainian: Syraja zemlja and mati - syra zemlja;
Belarusian: Maci syra zjamlja ("Маці сыра зямля"), and expression "The Sacred Earth, it is our mother" ("Зямля святая, яна наша маці");
West Slavic:
Polish: Mateczka Ziemia ("Little mother earth"); matka ziemia, ziemicka mamicka and do ziemi matusi.
South Slavic:
Bulgarian: Sura Zemya ('Moist Earth'), in folk songs, and surova zemya ("Сурова земя");
Serbian: mother Earth ("маjка-земља"), in an idiomatic expression;
Proto-Albanian: *dzō,
Albanian: dhe ('earth'), ritualized in the cult of the earth and oath swearings (beja me dhe), also appears in the divine names of Dheu, the chthonic serpent, and E Bukura e Dheut ('Beauty of the Earth'), a chthonic goddess.
Two parallel terms meaning 'human, earthling' are also attested as derivatives of the stem *dʰ(é)ǵʰ-:

 PIE: *dʰǵʰom-yo-, 'human, earthling',
 Sanskrit: kṣámyaḥ, 'terrestrial',
 Proto-Greek: *kʰtʰōnyos,
 Greek: chtónios (χθόνιος), 'belonging to the earth',
 Celtic: *gdonyo-, 'human, person',
 Gaulish: -xtonio-, 'human', in the expression deuogdonioi, 'gods-and-men',
 Old Irish: duine, 'human',
 Middle Welsh: dyn, 'human',
 PIE: dʰǵʰ(e)-mōn (acc. *dʰǵʰ-m-on-m), 'human, earthling',
 Italic: *χem-ō-, *χe/om-on-m,
 Latin: homō, hominis, 'human, man',
 Oscan: humuns, Umbrian: homonus, 'man',
 Germanic: *guman-, 'man',
 Gothic: guma, 'man',
 Old Norse: gumi, 'man',
 Old English: guma, Old Saxon: gumo, Old High German: gomo, 'man',
 Baltic:
 Old Lithuanian: žmuō, 'man'; Lith.: žmónės, 'people', žmonà, 'wife, woman',
 Old Prussian: smoy, 'man', smūni, 'person',

Additionally, remnants of the noun *dʰéǵʰōm can be found in formulaic phrases and religious epithets:

 Vedic: the compound Dyāvākṣamā, ('heaven and earth'), with kṣamā associated with the earth goddess Prithvi (the 'Broad One').
 Greek: the epithets χαμύνη (khamyne (de), 'of the land'), in reference to Deméter (in Pausanias 6.21.1), and Χαμοναῖα (khamynaia, 'on the ground'). A designation Χαμοναῖος (khamonaïos, 'of the ground'; 'of the earth') in reference to Zeus, is also attested. These epithets are considered cognates to χαμαί (khamaí, 'pertaining, belonging to the earth').

Possible reflexes
Other mythologies may show the presence of characters and expressions that are etymologically cognate to *Dheghom. However, these cognates are less secured:

Anatolian:
 Lydian: references to a cult of Men Tiamou ('of Tiamos') led scholars to believe Tiamou is an epithet that means 'of the Earth' or 'of the Netherworld', possibly connected to Luwian tiyamm(i) 'earth'. This expression would be equivalent to a common epithet of Men: καταχθονιος ('of the Underworld'; 'subterranean').
Hellenic:
 Doric: linguist Krzysztof Witczak suggests the dialectal Doric word "δηγῆ" dēgê, in the expression "δηγῆ και σιωπᾷ" ("earth and keeps silence"), is a possibly ancient loanword from Proto-Albanian.
 Greek: Damia, one of the Horae, a minor deity related to spring, growth and vegetation, and usually paired with fellow Horae Auxesia. Ancient literature suggests it might have been another name for Demeter.
Iranian:
The word is also attested in the personal name Ysamotika, and in the religious expression , meaning 'world'.
Tocharian: the expression tkamñkät (Tocharian A) and keṃ-ñäkte (Tocharian B) are used in religious Buddhist texts written in the Tocharian languages, where it denotes the earth or an 'earth-god' of some sort.
Italic:
Hunte, an Umbrian deity, possibly stemming from *ǵʰom-to- 'who is below'.
Semonia, obscure deity associated with crops and sowing, of possible Roman or Sabine origin and worship, usually attested with the epithet Salus Semonia. A possible male counterpart is Semo Sancus, god of Sabine provenance whose traits merged with Dius Fidius's. Semonia and Sancus appear with other agricultural/crop deities Seia and Segetia.
Celtic:
Old Irish: goddess Dana, taken by some Indo-Europeanist scholars to be an Irish earth goddess.
Welsh mythology: linguist John T. Koch interprets the family known as Children of Dôn (Plant Dôn) as "Children of the Earth", since the name of their matriach, Dôn, would derive from Celtic *ghdhonos ('the earth', gen.).
Baltic:
Lithuanian: Žemėpatis ('Earth Spouse') and Žemininkas, male deities associated with cattle, agriculture and the fertility of the land. Their names are present in historical records of the Lithuanian non-Christian faith by foreign missionaries. A male divinity with the name Zemeluks, Zamoluksei, Zameluks or Ziameluks is also said to be attested. An account tells he is a DEUS TERRAE ('earth god'), while in other he is "a lord or god of earth who was buried in the earth" by the Prussians.
Unclassified Indo-European languages:
Phrygian: the epithet ΓΔΑΝ ΜΑ (Gdan Ma), taken to mean 'Earth Mother', or a loan from Anatolian languages. However, the name appears as a compound in names of Asia Minor written in the Greek alphabet. Phrygian also attests the word KTON as referring to the earth.
 Thracian: Zemelā (possibly from *gʰem-elā); with a cognate in the Greek goddess Semele, and the obscure Dionysian epithet Semeleios (Semeleius or Semelēus), meaning 'He of the Earth', 'son of Semele'.
 Messapic: Damatura, from dā- (possibly from ) attached to matura ('mother'); maybe at the origin of the Greek goddess Demeter.

*Pleth₂wih₁ 
Cognates stemming from the epithet *Pleth₂wih₁ (the 'Broad One') are attested in the following traditions:

Old Hittite: palḫiš dankuiš daganzipaš, 'broad dark earth-genius',
Indo-Iranian: *pṛtH-uiH-,
Vedic: Pṛithvī Mātā (पृथ्वी) ('Mother Earth, the Vast One'), the most frequent Vedic word for both the earth and the Earth-goddess; and the poetic formula kṣā́m ... pṛthivī́m ('broad earth'), cf. also Prithu (Sanskrit: पृथु, Pṛthu), a mythological sovereign who chases the goddess Prthvi, shapeshifted as a cow; his name means 'far, wide, broad'.
Young Avestan: ząm pərəθβīm, 'broad earth',
Greek: Plátaia (Πλάταια), a naiad described as consort of Zeus and the daughter of the river Asopos; also the name given to the city of Plataea in Beotia,
Celtic: Litavī, probably an earth-goddess; also the divine name given to the peninsula of Brittany in medieval Celtic languages,
The word also survived in common terms for 'land, field':
Germanic: *fuldō, 'earth, ground, field, the world',
Old Norse: fold; Old English: folde, same meaning.
Proto-Slavic: *pȍļe, 'field',
Slavic mythology: Polevoi or Polevik, male deity of the fields; Polianitsa, name of a female bogatyr related to *pȍļe; Byely Polianin ('White Field-Dweller'), a folktale character;
Old Church Slavonic: polje, 'field'.

Other cognates are less secured:

Baltic:
Latvian: expression plata māte ('wide mother'), present in Latvian riddles about natural features and whose answer is "žeme" ('earth').
Italic:
Venetic: pletuvei, attested in a funerary monument; and Pultovia.
Vestinian: Peltuinum.
Umbrian: Pletinas, an epithet assigned to Italic goddess Cupra.
Celtic:
Celtiberian: letontu; Letondonis (attested as a personal name); leitasama (superlative form of adjective, attested on a coin).
Gallaecian:  (modern Ledesma, Salamanca), attested in a rock carving inscribed in a tombstone.
Hispano-Celtic: the toponym Ledaña (es) (in Cuenca, Spain), thought to derive from *.
Gaulish: Litana, toponym describing "a vast forest" located in North Italy, which, according to historiographer Titus Livius, "was named Litania by the Gauls"; the site of the historical Battle of Silva Litana.
Gallo-Roman: Litanobriga, a Celtic settlement of unknown location.

Parallels
Although not considered a cognate to either Dʰéǵʰōm or Pleth₂wih₁, deity Spenta Armaiti, of Zoroastrism religion, is associated with the earth, with fertility and farmers as well as the dead.

A counterpart exists in pre-Christian Armenian mythology, named Spandaramet or Sandaramet, whose role is connected to earth and the underworld. Namely, she was the "Armenian earth-goddess" of vineyards, but also ruled over those that are asleep', i.e. the dead". She is considered to have been developed from her Zoroastrian counterpart, Spenta Armaiti, a female being in that tradition. Spandaremet was transformed into a male god of the Underworld in later Armenian tradition, and, under Christian influence, lent her name to an underworld realm where evil spirits are said to dwell.

Both deities are seen, in their respective religions, as the wife or companion of a sky-god, Ahura Mazda or Aramazd. He, in turn, is said to be the deity of rains in some accounts.

See also
Earth goddess

External links 
piereligion.org page

Footnotes

References

Bibliography

Further reading

 Dundulienė, Pranė (1976). "Žemė lietuvių tikėjimuose ir liaudies mene. In: Istorija 16.1: 129-153.

 Hamp, Eric P. "On the Paradigm of OIr. dú". In: Zeitschrift für celtische Philologie 44, no. 1 (1991): 76-78. https://doi.org/10.1515/zcph.1991.44.1.76

 Oettinger, Norbert. "Die 'dunkle Erde' Im Hethitischen Und Griechischen: Alfred Heubeck Zum Gedächtnis (20.7. 1914–24.5. 1987)". In: Die Welt Des Orients 20/21 (1989): 83-98. Accessed April 27, 2021. http://www.jstor.org/stable/25683330.
 Rico, Christophe. "L'équivalence χθών: sk. kşám. Nouvelle approche d'un vieux débat". In: Indogermanische Forschungen 109, issue 2004 (2004): 61-111. https://doi.org/10.1515/16130405.61
 Steer, Thomas. "Uridg. *dh(e)ǵhōm 'Erde' und *ǵʰ(e)i̯ōm 'Winter'". In: Indogermanische Forschungen 118, no. 2013 (2013): 55-92. https://doi.org/10.1515/indo.2013.118.2013.55
 Toporov, Vladimir N. "К реконструкции балто-славянского мифологического образа Земли-Матери *Zemi̯a & *Mātē (Mati)" [Towards a reconstruction of the Balto-Slavic mythological image of Earth Mother *Zemia & *Mate (Mati)]. In: Балто-славянские исследования. 1998–1999. ХIV. Москва: 2010 [2000]. pp. 241–371. 

Proto-Indo-European deities
Earth goddesses
Etymologies
Reconstructed words
Proto-Indo-European mythology
European mythology
Paganism
Religious studies